Stefan Edberg defeated the two-time defending champion Mats Wilander in the final, 6–4, 6–3, 6–3 to win the men's singles tennis title at the 1985 Australian Open. Edberg saved two match points en route to the title, against Wally Masur in the fourth round.

This event marked the first time in Australian Open history that no Australian was among the top 16 seeds, and that no Australian reached the quarterfinals.

Seeds
The seeded players are listed below. Stefan Edberg is the champion; others show the round in which they were eliminated.

  Ivan Lendl (semifinals)
  John McEnroe (quarterfinals)
  Mats Wilander (final)
  Boris Becker (second round)
  Stefan Edberg (champion)
  Johan Kriek (quarterfinals)
  Joakim Nyström (fourth round)
  Tim Mayotte (fourth round)
  Scott Davis (second round)
  Brad Gilbert (third round)
  Tomáš Šmíd (second round)
  Paul Annacone (third round)
  Henri Leconte (fourth round)
  Henrik Sundström (second round)
  David Pate (second round)
  Greg Holmes (second round)

Qualifying

Draw

Key
 Q = Qualifier
 WC = Wild card
 LL = Lucky loser
 r = Retired

Finals

Top half

Section 1

Section 2

Section 3

Section 4

Bottom half

Section 5

Section 6

Section 7

Section 8

External links
 Association of Tennis Professionals (ATP) – 1985 Australian Open Men's Singles draw
 1985 Australian Open – Men's draws and results at the International Tennis Federation

Mens singles
Australian Open (tennis) by year – Men's singles